G2ZT is a bistetrazole.  It is an explosive approximately as powerful as RDX, but it releases less toxic reaction products when detonated: ammonia and hydrogen cyanide.  When combined with ADN or AN oxidizers, the amount of HCN produced by a deflagration may be reduced.  The compound is thus considered by its advocates to be an environmentally friendlier explosive than traditional nitroamine-based explosives.

G2ZT is otherwise known as bis(3,4,5-triamino-1,2,4-triazolium) 5,5'-azotetrazolate.

References

Further reading
 

Tetrazoles
Explosives
Azo compounds
Triazoles